José Ulises Solís Pérez (born 28 August 1981) is a Mexican former professional boxer who competed from 2000 to 2013. He held the IBF junior flyweight title twice in his career from 2006 to 2009 and from 2011 to 2012. He is the brother of former boxer Jorge Solís.

Professional career
In April 2000, Solis won his professional debut against Adolfo Rosillo. He compiled a record of 18-0-1, which included a win over future champion Edgar Sosa.

WBO Light Flyweight Championship
On July 30, 2004, Solis challenged WBO Light Flyweight champion Nelson Dieppa but lost the twelve round bout.

IBF Light Flyweight Championship
On January 7, 2006, Solís defeated Will Grigsby for the IBF world championship title, by a unanimous decision (118-110, 117-111, 116-112). He defended his title against former champion Eric Ortiz and Omar Salado.

On January 25, 2008, Solis faced Grigsby in a rematch and defeated him once again by stopping him in the 8th round. On May 19, 2007, Solis defeated former WBC world champion José Antonio Aguirre via an 8th round technical knock out. On August 4, 2007, he defeated Filipino future champion Rodel Mayol (23-1-0) by technical knockout. On December 15, 2007, Solis defended his title against Filipino veteran boxer Bert Batawang.

Solís was scheduled to face Glenn Donaire on May 17, 2008,  however, he was forced to back out after he came down with a serious case of pneumonia. The fight was rescheduled for July 12 at the Palenque De La Expo in Hermosillo, Sonora, Mexico. at Hermosillo, Monterrey, Mexico, 12 rounds. Solis retained the title by scoring a shutout on all 3 judges cards (by the scores of 120-108 twice and 120-117).

On December 2, 2008, Solis defeated Nicaraguan Nerys Espinoza by unanimous decision. In total, he defended his IBF title eight times.

Solis lost the IBF light-flyweight title after he was knocked out in the 11th round of his title bout vs Brian Viloria. On March 27, 2010, Solis defeated Bert Batawang for a second time in an IBF light flyweight title eliminator bout after Batawang retired in the 6th round. Following that victory, Solis defeated former champion Eric Ortiz by a 10-round unanimous decision at the Grand Sierra Resort in Reno, NV commemorating the 100th anniversary of The Johnson-Jeffries Fight. During this time, Viloria lost the IBF title by knock out to Carlos Tamara, who in turn, lost the title by split decision to Luis Alberto Lazarte.

Regaining the IBF Light Flyweight Championship
On December 18, 2010, Solis fought IBF light flyweight champion Luis Alberto Lazarte to a controversial majority draw in Argentina. Solis outboxed Lazarte for the first half of the bout while a frustrated Lazarte repeatedly fouled Solis with illegal punches to the back of the head and below the belt, at one point, even going so far as to bite the challenger. The referee, Max Parker, who had trouble communicating with the fighters in Spanish, warned Lazarte throughout the bout, however, he ultimately only deducted two points from the defending champion. The final scores were 117-109 in favor of Solis while the other two judges controversially scored it 113-113 even. Solis' promoter, Fernando Beltran, is expected to file a formal protest to the IBF on his behalf.

On April 30, 2011, Solis faced Lazarte in a rematch of their controversial bout. Solis defeated Lazarte by a 12-round split decision in Argentina to claim the IBF light flyweight title.

Altercation with Canelo Álvarez and layoff
In October 2011, he got into a street fight against fellow Mexican boxer and four-division champion Canelo Álvarez resulting in a broken jaw. He planned to press charges against Álvarez but ultimately settled an agreement four years after the incident. Solís was forced to vacate his IBF light flyweight title and had a long lay off from the sport after that.

Professional boxing record

See also
Notable boxing families
List of IBF world champions
List of Mexican boxing world champions

References

External links

Boxers from Jalisco
Sportspeople from Guadalajara, Jalisco
International Boxing Federation champions
World boxing champions
World light-flyweight boxing champions
Light-flyweight boxers
1981 births
Living people
Mexican male boxers